Matchbook Romance was an American emo band from Poughkeepsie, New York and was formed in 1997. They were signed to Epitaph Records. They released two full-length albums and one EP. Their EP, West for Wishing, released in 2003 was their first recorded album during their time on Epitaph; their full-length debut album, Stories and Alibis, was recorded in the same year.

History
The group debuted with West for Wishing, an EP released in early 2003, and later they released their first LP, Stories and Alibis, in September 2003. They also appeared on a 4-song split with Motion City Soundtrack in which an acoustic version of "Playing for Keeps" and "In Transit for You" appeared.

In 2006 on their second album, Voices, the band decided to change their sound and get away from what they had originally been producing. Their song "Monsters" appeared in Madden NFL 07, Arena Football: Road to Glory, and Guitar Hero III: Legends of Rock.

On March 12, 2007, after a 10-year career, they announced via a MySpace bulletin that they were going on an indefinite hiatus.

In May 2009, the band played three reunion shows on the East Coast.

Matchbook Romance has not yet stated if they are still going to work together or are splitting for good. Stern went on to join God or Julie. Guitarist Ryan "Judas" DePaolo started his own band called HILLvalley and debuted their first album called "Salutations" in the summer of 2009, and followed with "Upside Down" in the summer of 2011.

After touring with You, Me, and Everyone We Know from 2008–2010, drummer Aaron Stern joined the supergroup D.R.U.G.S. (Destroy Rebuild Until God Shows) started by Craig Owens, formerly of Chiodos. A debut album was released on February 22, 2011. The band split up in 2012.

Andrew Jordan is now promoting his new project called "DriftDivision". A six-song self-titled EP was released on October 26, 2010. In a video posted he stated that he worked on some songs with bass player Ryan Kienle. In 2011 he released a new video for the song "Hush".

It was announced that Matchbook Romance would be playing select dates on the 2015 Vans Warped Tour.

Band members
 Andrew Jordan – lead vocals, rhythm guitar, piano, keyboard
 Ryan "Judas" DePaolo – lead guitar, vocals, programming, synthesizer
 Ryan Kienle – bass guitar, backing vocals
 Aaron Stern – drums, percussion
 Chris Vicious – Touring guitar

Discography
Studio albums
Stories and Alibis (Epitaph Records, 2003)
Voices (Epitaph Records, 2006) U.S. No. 43

EPs
West for Wishing (Epitaph Records, 2003)

Compilations featured on
Nada Recording Studio 2002 Sampler (Broken English Records), 2002 Featuring an early version of "If All Else Fails" from Stories and Alibis
Take Action! Tour Sampler Album (Sub City Records, 2005)
Matchbook Romance/Motion City Soundtrack Split EP (Epitaph Records, 2004)
Punk-O-Rama Vol. 8 (Epitaph Records, 2003)
Punk-O-Rama Vol. 9 (Epitaph Records, 2004)
Punk-O-Rama Vol. 10 (Epitaph Records, 2005)
2003 Warped Tour Compilation (Side One Dummy Records, 2003)
2004 Warped Tour Compilation (Side One Dummy Records, 2004)
2006 Warped Tour Compilation (Side One Dummy Records, 2006)
Atticus: ...Dragging the Lake, Vol. 2 (Side One Dummy Records, 2003)
A Santa Cause: It's a Punk Rock Christmas (Immortal Records, 2003)
The Best of Taste of Chaos (Warcon Records, 2006)

Music videos
"Promise" (2003)
"My Eyes Burn" (2003)
"Monsters" (2006)

References

External links
AbsolutePunk. net Review of Voices
Punknews.org Profile of Matchbook Romance (Reviews, Interviews)
Voices Album Review at  UKEvents.net

Epitaph Records artists
American post-hardcore musical groups
American emo musical groups
Musical groups established in 1997
Musical groups disestablished in 2007
Musical groups reestablished in 2015
Musical groups disestablished in 2016
Musical quartets
1997 establishments in New York (state)